BGL Group (formerly Budget Group Limited) is a financial services company based in Orton Southgate, Peterborough, England. Its main lines of business are vehicle and home insurance, with a range of supplementary products such as breakdown cover, legal protection and personal accident cover.

History
The company was founded in 1992 by Douw Steyn as the Budget Insurance Company, an underwriter. Budget Insurance Services Limited (BISL) was founded in 1997 and the following year Budget Insurance Company ceased underwriting and became an intermediary business, marketing policies underwritten by a panel of insurers. In 1999 it acquired Arnott Century, and changed its name to Budget Retail. The group acquired Dial Direct and Bennetts in 2001. In 2002 it launched an affinity business, called Junction which was a major contributor to its growth through partners such as Post Office, M&S Money, Bradford & Bingley, and Yes Insurance.

In 2003, the company launched its own uninsured loss recovery business, ACM ULR, and in the same year it ran a PR and marketing campaign for Bennetts, helping to establish the bike insurer as a leading brand in the UK market. In 2004, Budget was noted as providing the most competitive home insurance, and the cheapest motor insurance cover.

The company opened its Cape Town Contact Centre in 2004, set up Comparethemarket.com as a complementary service in 2005, and sold Budget Retail in 2006. In July 2007 the company changed its name to BGL Group, launching an eco-friendly car insurance site, ibuyeco.co.uk, and relaunching the comparethemarket.com insurance price comparison site.

The year 2009 saw the creation of comparethemeerkat.com – online meerkat comparison website as part of a spoof advertising campaign featuring a CGI meerkat character named Aleksandr Orlov. French price comparison sites LesFurets.com and CreditMieux.com were acquired in 2010, and Dutch site Verzekeringssite.nl was acquired in 2012. The latter was rebranded as hoyhoy.nl in 2014.

In 2013, BGL group launched Beagle Street, the first online-only life insurer in the UK.  In 2022 Beagle Street was acquired by OneFamily.

In 2015, Bennetts was sold to Saga Group.

The Canada Pension Plan Investment Board acquired a 30% stake in BGL in November 2017 for £675 million.

In January 2022, BGL sold its insurance business to Markerstudy, leaving Comparethemarket as its primary remaining business. BGL was advised by Dentons on the transaction.

Today
The group's main company name is BISL Limited, which was founded in 1996 – trading under the names of Budget, Dial Direct, Bennetts, Junction, ACM ULR, Fusion (no connection with the UK commercial insurer of the same name, established in 2001).

in 2013 the FSA intervened and forced BISL to change its policy cancellation terms, as a result of which BISL stated: "BISL has agreed to change the cancellation terms in its policies. This is because we believe the original terms were confusing and unfair".

The BGL Group employs 2,852 staff across the UK with sales of £714 million and profits of £172 million to the end of June 2019.

Notes

References
The History of Budget
Budget Group Case Study

External links

CompareTheMarket.com

Financial services companies established in 1992
Insurance companies of the United Kingdom
Companies based in Peterborough
CPP Investment Board companies